John D. Dunning (May 5, 1916 – February 25, 1991) was an American film editor who worked on several large-scale Hollywood movies from 1947 to 1970.  He was an editor contracted to MGM Studios. While working with MGM, Dunning was picked by the famed director Frank Capra to collorabate with him  on a World War II series of seven patriotic films for the American public, collectively called Why We Fight, produced from 1942 to 1945.  This early relation with Capra honed his skills with a talented director  and brought him to the professional recognition in the film world.

This  recognition proved fruitful when the low-budget war film Battleground became a sleeper hit in 1949, earning critical praise and several Oscar nominations, including one for Best Film Editing.

Dunning worked on the remake of Show Boat (1951); Joseph L. Mankiewicz's Julius Caesar, an adaptation of Shakespeare's  play (1953); and the Southern epic Raintree County (1957). In 1959 he won an Oscar for Best Film Editing, shared with Ralph E. Winters, for Ben-Hur.

Dunning then moved to television, where he edited The Man from U.N.C.L.E..

Dunning retired in 1970.  He was married to Ruth Dunning (née Danson).  Together they had three children, John Dunning, Robert Dunning and Barbara Dunning.  After Dunning retired, he and son Robert ran a winery in Paso Robles, California, Dunning Vineyards, which Robert began on his father's property in Malibu.  Barbara Dunning followed her father into the editing business, working as a freelance editor on films such as Cocktail, Green Card and Die Hard 2.

At Dunning's funeral in 1991, Frank Capra and the senior staff of MGM were there to pay their respects.

References

External links

American film editors
Best Film Editing Academy Award winners
1916 births
1991 deaths
Place of birth missing